Alyosha is an affectionate diminutive (hypocorism) of the name Alexey and may refer to:

People
Alyosha (singer) (born 1986), Ukrainian pop singer
Alyosha Abrahamyan (1945–2018), Armenian football player
Alyosha Andonov (born 1961), Bulgarian football coach
Alyosha Dzhaparidze (1880–1918), Georgian Bolshevik
Alyosha Efros, American computer scientist
Alyosha Svanidze (1886–1941), Georgian Bolshevik

Fictional characters
Alyosha Karamazov, protagonist of Dostoyevsky's The Brothers Karamazov
Alyosha Kravinoff, real name of comic book villain Kraven the Hunter II
Alyosha Popovich, Russian folk hero
Alyosha Skvortsov, protagonist of the 1959 film Ballad of a Soldier
Alyosha the Pot, protagonist of Tolstoy's short story of the same name

Monuments
Alyosha Monument, Murmansk, Russia World War II monument
Alyosha Monument, Plovdiv, Bulgarian World War II monument
"Alyosha" (song), a 1966 song inspired by the Plovdiv monument
Bronze Soldier of Tallinn, Estonian World War II monument sometimes called Alyosha

See also
Ivan & Alyosha, an American indie rock band
Aliocha Schneider (born 1993), Canadian actor